Alexander Krieger (born 28 November 1991 in Stuttgart) is a German cyclist, who currently rides for UCI ProTeam .

Major results

2012
 8th Neuseen Classics - Rund um die Braunkohle
2014
 2nd Omloop Mandel-Leie-Schelde
 4th Road race, National Road Championships
 4th Omloop van het Waasland
 4th Ronde van Zeeland Seaports
 6th Rund um Köln
 7th Ronde van Limburg
2015
 5th Overall Le Triptyque des Monts et Châteaux
2016
 6th Overall Oberösterreich Rundfahrt
 6th Grand Prix de la ville de Pérenchies
2017
 3rd Midden–Brabant Poort Omloop
 4th Bruges Cycling Classic
 4th Grand Prix de la ville de Pérenchies
 6th Grote Prijs Jean-Pierre Monseré
 8th Arno Wallaard Memorial
 8th Grote Prijs Jef Scherens
 10th Overall Paris–Arras Tour
2018
 2nd Overall Tour de Normandie
 4th Grand Prix de la ville de Pérenchies
 5th Road race, National Road Championships
 5th Overall Tour de Luxembourg
 6th Overall Circuit des Ardennes
 6th Famenne Ardenne Classic
 6th Grote Prijs Jean-Pierre Monseré
 6th Elfstedenronde
 7th Münsterland Giro
 7th Paris–Troyes
 9th Grote Prijs Marcel Kint
 9th Rund um Köln
 9th Grand Prix Albert Fauville-Baulet
 9th Grote Prijs Jef Scherens
2019
 2nd Midden–Brabant Poort Omloop
 7th Grote Prijs Marcel Kint
2020
 2nd Paris–Chauny
 3rd Road race, National Road Championships
 4th Antwerp Port Epic
 5th Tour du Doubs
 7th Overall Tour de Luxembourg

Grand Tour general classification results timeline

References

External links

1991 births
Living people
German male cyclists
European Games competitors for Germany
Cyclists at the 2019 European Games
Sportspeople from Stuttgart
Cyclists from Baden-Württemberg